Steven James Pemberton (born 1 September 1967) is a British actor, comedian, director and writer. He is best known as a member of The League of Gentlemen with Reece Shearsmith, Mark Gatiss, and Jeremy Dyson. Pemberton and Shearsmith also co-wrote and starred in the black comedy Psychoville and the anthology series Inside No. 9. His other television credits include Doctor Who, Benidorm, Blackpool, Shameless, Whitechapel, Happy Valley and Mapp and Lucia.

Early life
Steve Pemberton is originally from Blackburn, Lancashire and attended Saint Michaels Church of England High School, Chorley.

Career

Film and television
Pemberton’s television performance credits include Whitechapel, Doctor Who, Benidorm, Under the Greenwood Tree, Hotel Babylon, The Last Detective, Randall and Hopkirk, Blackpool and Shameless. In 2004, he portrayed Dr Bessner in Death on the Nile and Harry Secombe in The Life and Death of Peter Sellers. He also appeared in the film Lassie (2005).

Pemberton is best known as being a member of the sketch comedy team The League of Gentlemen, along with fellow performers Mark Gatiss, Reece Shearsmith, and co-writer Jeremy Dyson, all of whom he met at Bretton Hall College in his late teens. The League of Gentlemen initially began as a stage act in 1995, then transferred to BBC Radio 4 as On the Town with the League of Gentlemen in 1997, and finally arrived on television on BBC Two in 1999. The latter has seen Pemberton and his colleagues awarded a British Academy Television Award, a Royal Television Society Award, and a Golden Rose of Montreux.

From 2007 to 2015, Pemberton appeared as Mick Garvey in Benidorm. Pemberton appeared in 43 episodes.

In the 2008 English language DVD re-release of the cult 2006 Norwegian animated film Free Jimmy, Pemberton voiced Mattis, a heavy-set and bizarrely-dressed biker member of the Lappish Mafia. In June 2009, Psychoville aired and marked Pemberton's return to BBC Two. It was co-written by Pemberton and his fellow League of Gentlemen member, Reece Shearsmith. Both of them play numerous characters in the series, similar to the format of The League of Gentlemen.

Pemberton portrayed Rufus Drumknott in 2010's Terry Pratchett's Going Postal. He appeared as Vice Principal Douglas Panch in the Donmar's 2011 production of The 25th Annual Putnam County Spelling Bee. In 2014, he played Georgie Pillson in an adaptation of E.F. Benson's Mapp and Lucia. He also wrote the adaptation, which featured his League of Gentlemen cohort Mark Gatiss. It was broadcast during Christmas 2014. Since 2014, he has starred as various characters in the dark comedy anthology series Inside No. 9, which he co-created with Shearsmith, airing on BBC Two. Series six aired in 2021.

Pemberton reunited with his The League of Gentlemen colleagues in 2017 for three special episodes, transmitted in December 2017 on BBC2. He appeared as himself in the 2018 short film To Trend on Twitter in aid of young people with cancer charity CLIC Sargent with fellow comedians David Baddiel, Reece Shearsmith, Helen Lederer and actor Jason Flemyng.

In October 2021, Pemberton was nominated for Best Outstanding Comedy Actor at the inaugural National Comedy Awards for Stand Up to Cancer for his appearances in series 6 of Inside No. 9.

The seventh series of Inside No. 9 premiered on 20 April 2022.

Theatre
Pemberton's early work centred mainly around fringe theatre; he was a founding member of the 606 Theatre with Gordon Anderson, Tom Hadley, and producer Shane Walter. He has produced, performed in, and directed various stage productions.

In 2020 it was announced that Pemberton would join Aaron Taylor-Johnson on West End stage in Martin McDonagh’s The Pillowman, directed by Matthew Dunster. However, due to the Covid-19 situation, the run was postponed until 2021. Pemberton said, “It’s been a dark time for the performing arts and I can’t wait to have the theatres open again. Unfortunately, The Pillowman has to be put to bed for now, but I very much hope that we’ll be able to bring Martin’s dazzling play to the West End before too long.” The play is due to be revived from 10 June 2023 to 2 September 2023 at the Duke of York's Theatre in London's West End. It stars Pemberton, Lily Allen, Paul Kaye and Matthew Tennison.

Other
Pemberton has written for Variety and was the assistant editor of the International Film Guide from 1991 to 1998.

Personal life
Pemberton lives in Fortis Green, London, with his partner, Alison Rowles, and their three children. He speaks German and French.

Filmography

Film

Television

Stage

Awards and nominations

References

Sources

External links
 

1967 births
Living people
20th-century English male actors
21st-century English male actors
Alumni of Bretton Hall College
Best Male Comedy Performance BAFTA Award (television) winners
British radio writers
English comedy writers
English male comedians
English male film actors
English male radio actors
English male stage actors
English male television actors
Male actors from Lancashire
People from Blackburn
The League of Gentlemen